is a stratovolcano located in the Daisetsuzan Volcanic Group of the Ishikari Mountains, [[Hiranai, Higashitsugaru-Gun, Aomori
Japan]], Japan.

See also
List of volcanoes in Japan
List of mountains in Japan

References
 Geographical Survey Institute

Mountains of Hokkaido
Volcanoes of Hokkaido
Stratovolcanoes of Japan